Architecture of Bangladesh is intertwined with the architecture of the Bengal region and the broader Indian subcontinent. The architecture of Bangladesh has a long history and is rooted in Bangladesh's culture, religion and history. It has evolved over centuries and assimilated influences from social, religious and exotic communities. The architecture of Bangladesh bears a remarkable impact on the lifestyle, tradition and cultural life of Bangladeshi people. Bangladesh has many architectural relics and monuments dating back thousands of years.

Pala Buddhist architecture

The Pala Empire was an early Indian empire of Bengali Buddhist dynasty ruling from Bengal (which included present-day Bangladesh) from the 8th to the 12th centuries. The Palas created a distinctive form of Bengali architecture and art known as the "Pala School of Sculptural Art." The central shrine of the Paharpur vihara was the mature form of a cruciform Buddhist shrine and Śikhara-śirsha-bhadra type. The gigantic structures of Vikramashila Vihar, Odantpuri Vihar, and Jagaddal Vihar were masterpieces of the Palas. These mammoth structures were destroyed by the forces of the infamous Bakhtiar Khilji. The Somapura Mahavihara, a creation of Dharmapala, at Paharpur, Bangladesh, is the largest Buddhist Vihara in the Indian subcontinent and has been described as a "pleasure to the eyes of the world." UNESCO made it a World Heritage Site in 1985. The Pala architectural style was followed throughout south-eastern Asia and China, Japan, and Tibet. Bengal rightfully earned the name "Mistress of the East". Dr. Stella Kramrisch says: "The art of Bihar and Bengal exercised a lasting influence on that of Nepal, Burma, Ceylon and Java." Dhiman and Vittpala were two celebrated Pala sculptors. About Somapura Mahavihara, Mr J.C. French says with grief: "For the research of the Pyramids of Egypt we spend millions of dollars every year. But had we spent only one per cent of that money for the excavation of Somapura Mahavihara, who knows what extraordinary discoveries could have been made".

Indo-Islamic Architecture 

The Sultanate of Bengal was an era of the Central Asian origin Muslim Nawab dynasty that ruled independently of the Mughal Empire from 1342 to 1576. Most of the Muslim architecture of the period is found in the historic Gaur region, today's Rajshahi division and Malda district in West Bengal. The architecture of the period is noted for the development of a uniquely local style influenced by Bengali architectural traditions. Sonargaon was also a Sultanate capital (capital of the Baro-Bhuyan Confederacy) before the arrival of the Mughals and Dhaka within the confines of Dholai Khal was their trading outpost Sultanate architecture is exemplified in structures such as the Shat Gombuj Masjid, the Shona Masjid and the Kusumba Masjid.

Mughal Architecture

In 1576, much of Bengal came under the control of the Mughal Empire. At the time, Dhaka emerged as a Mughal military base. The development of townships and housing had resulted in significant growth in population, as the town was proclaimed by Subahdar Islam Khan I as the capital of Subah Bangala in 1608, during this time many mosques and forts had been built. Bara Katra was built between 1644 and 1646 CE to be the official residence of the Mughal prince Shah Shuja, the second son of the emperor Shah Jahan.

Indian Mughal architecture in present-day Bangladesh reached its peak during the reign of Subedar
Shaista Khan, He stayed in the old Afghan fort in the area (present old central jail) and encouraged the construction of modern townships and public works in Dhaka, leading to a massive urban and economic expansion. He was a patron of the arts and encouraged the construction of majestic monuments across the province, including mosques, mausoleums and palaces that represented the finest in Mughal architecture. Khan laid the foundation of Lalbagh Fort (also Fort Aurangabad), Chowk Bazaar Mosque, Lalbagh Shahi Mosque, Saat Masjid, Anderkilla Shahi Jame Mosque and Choto Katra. He also supervised the construction of the mausoleum for his daughter Bibi Pari in the fort area.

Terracotta temple architecture
Much of the terracotta temple architecture in Bangladesh dates to the late Islamic period and early British period during which wealthy Hindu zamindars commissioned these structures.
 Temple architecture styles:
ek-bangla, have a curved roof with two sloping sides
Jor-bangla, has a roof of the ek-Bangla (or do-Chala) style, with two curved segments that meet at a curved ridge
ek-chala, single-story or has a second story built into a sloping roof
Do-chala, have a curved roof with two sloping sides
Char-chala, have a curved roof composed of four triangular segments
At-chala, the base structure is similar to the four-sided char-Chala temple style, but with a small replica of the base temple on top
Deul, were generally smaller and included features influenced by Islamic architecture
Ek-ratna, the base structure is similar to the four-sided char-Chala temple style, but the roof is quite different, flat with a tower in the centre. 
Pancharatna, has five pavilions or towers on the roof; four stands at the corners of the main level, and one above.
Navaratna, incorporates two main levels, each with four spired corner pavilions, and a central pavilion above, for a total of nine spires.

British Colonial period

Common Bungalow Style Architecture 

The origin of the bungalow has its roots in the historical Province of Bengal. The term baṅgalo, meaning  "Bengali" and used elliptically for a "house in the Bengal style". Such houses were traditionally front house/outhouse/Banglaghar/Kacharighar of homesteads which were small, only one storey and detached, and had a wide veranda were adopted by the British who assumed it to be a legitimate Bengali house, who expanded and used them as houses for colonial administrators in summer retreats in the Himalayas and in compounds outside Indian cities. The term "bungalow" is derived from "Bangla ghar".
The Bungalow style houses are still very popular in the rural Bengal. In the rural areas of Bangladesh, it is often called Bangla Ghar (Bengali Style House). The main construction material used in modern time is corrugated steel sheets. Previously they had been constructed from wood, bamboo and a kind of straw called Khar. Khar was used in the roof of the Bungalow house and kept the house cold during hot summer days. Another roofing material for Bungalow houses has been red clay tiles.

Indo-Saracenic Revival architecture

In the British colonial age predominantly representative buildings of the Indo-European style developed, from a mixture of mainly Indian, European and Central Asian (Islamic) components. Amongst the more prominent works are Ahsan Manzil in Dhaka and Tajhat Palace in Rangpur City.

Modern Bangladeshi Architecture
In the modern context, Bangladeshi architecture has become more diversified comprising reflections of contemporary architectural attributes, aesthetic and technologically advanced aspects. Since the inception of Bangladesh, economical advancement has boosted the architecture from its traditional forms to contemporary context. With the growing urbanization and modernization, the architectural form is turning into modernity covering a wide range of its heritage and tradition. The architecture of Bangladesh can provide insight into the history and lives of the Bangladeshi people.

Fazlur Rahman Khan was a structural engineer and architect, who initiated structural systems that are fundamental to tall building design today. Regarded as the "Einstein of structural engineering", his "tubular designs" for high rises revolutionized tall building design. Most buildings over 40-storeys constructed since the 1960s now use a tube design derived from Khan's structural engineering principles. He is the designer of Willis Tower – the second tallest building in the United States (once tallest and tallest in the world for many years), John Hancock Centre, Hajj Terminal, etc. Fazlur Rahman's innovations not only make the buildings structurally stronger and more efficient, they significantly reduce the usage of materials (economically much more efficient) while simultaneously allow buildings to reach even greater heights. Tubular systems allow greater interior space and further enable buildings to take on various shapes, offering unprecedented freedom to architects. He also invented the sky lobby for high rises and helped in initiating the widespread usage of computers for structural engineering. Fazlur Rahman is the foremost structural engineer-architect of the 20th century who left an unprecedented and lasting influence on the profession, both nationally and internationally. Fazlur Rahman, more than any other individual, ushered in a renaissance in skyscraper construction during the second half of the 20th century and made it possible for people to live and work in "cities in the sky". Khan created a legacy of innovations by blending the articulation of interior spaces with the evolved structural systems that are unparalleled and became an icon in both architecture and structural engineering.

Gallery

See also

Architecture of Bengal
List of Bangladeshi architects
Muzharul Islam
Shahbaz Khan Mosque
Shona Mosque
Bagha Mosque
Khan Mohammad Mridha Mosque

Further reading
 Zahiruddin, S. A., Mowla, Q. A., Helaluzzaman, A.K.M. 1985, Role of Government in Architecture, in Robert Powell (Ed.) Regionalism in Architecture – Exploring Architecture in Islamic Cultures, Singapore: Concept Media Pvt. Ltd., 1985. 156–161.
 Mowla, Q A. 2017, Conservation Tools of Contemporary Architecture and Settlements in Bangladesh, Massimo Visone and Ugo Carughi (Eds), 'Time Frames: Conservation Policies for Twentieth-Century Architectural Heritage' published for the Italian Ministry of Foreign Affairs, ICCROM, University of Naples Federico II, by Routledge in 2017.
 Qazi Azizul Mowla and Q. A. Zahra, "Historic Settlement of Panamnagar: A Case for Conservation", Bagha, Bagha & Chaudhary (Eds), 'Contemporary Architecture Beyond Corbusierism' MACMILLAN Advanced Research Series Publication, New Delhi, 2011.pp. 236–246.
 Mowla, Q.A. 2011:'Urban Aesthetics: A Study on Dhaka' in 'The History Heritage and Urban Issues of Capital Dhaka', Vol.III, published by the Asiatic Society of Bangladesh, to celebrate the 400 years of Capital Dhaka. pp. 167–186.
 Mowla, Q.A. 2012: Dhaka: A Mega-City of Persistence and Change, (Chapter 12) in Misra, R.P. (Ed): Urbanization in South Asia – Focus on Mega Cities, Cambridge University Press, New Delhi. pp 341–372.
 Mowla, Q A and Reza, ATM, 2000 Stylistic Evolution of Architecture in Bangladesh: From a Colony to a Free Country, Asiatic Society of Bangladesh Journal, Dhaka, 45(1), 2000, 31–58.
 Mowla, Q A & Sheik, Z U. 2009 Documenting the Architectural Style of the Antiquity Buildings in Panam Street, Pratnatatva: the Journal of the Dept. of Archaeology, JU Vol.15; June 2009, pp. 79–97.

References

External links

 Mosque architecture of Bangladesh on Banglapedia.
 Architecture BD, an online magazine about the architecture of Bangladesh
 Architecture in Bangladesh

 
Bangladeshi culture
Science and technology in Bangladesh
Bangladesh